Tengiz Ugrekhelidze (born 29 July 1981) is a Georgian former professional football defender.

Club career
Ugrekhelidze joined Ukrainian Premier League side FC Nyva Ternopil in 2001. He left for Georgian league side FC Torpedo Kutaisi in 2004.

Ugrekhelidze has played for the Georgia national football team at various junior levels.

References

External links
Profile at UEFA.com

1981 births
Living people
Footballers from Georgia (country)
Expatriate footballers from Georgia (country)
Expatriate footballers in Ukraine
Expatriate sportspeople from Georgia (country) in Ukraine
Expatriate footballers in Armenia
Expatriate footballers in Belarus
Ukrainian Premier League players
Armenian Premier League players
FC Nyva Ternopil players
FC Torpedo Minsk players
FC Sioni Bolnisi players
FC Lokomotivi Tbilisi players
FC Dinamo Batumi players
FC Torpedo Kutaisi players
Ulisses FC players
Association football defenders